Tamminen is a Finnish surname. Notable people with the surname include:

Eero Tamminen (born 1995), Finnish footballer
Henri Tamminen (born 1993), Finnish ice hockey player
Juhani Tamminen (born 1950), Finnish ice hockey player
Kauko Tamminen (1920-1989), Finnish politician
Laura Tamminen, Finnish speed skater
Lauri Tamminen (1919–2010), Finnish hammer thrower
Noora Tamminen (born 1990), Finnish professional golfer
Roope Tamminen, Finnish game developer
Taavi Tamminen (1889–1967), Finnish sport wrestler
Terry Tamminen (born 1952), American writer

See also

Finnish-language surnames